A clerihew is a whimsical, four-line biographical poem of a type invented by Edmund Clerihew Bentley. The first line is the name of the poem's subject, usually a famous person, and the remainder puts the subject in an absurd light or reveals something unknown or spurious about the subject. The rhyme scheme is AABB, and the rhymes are often forced.  The line length and metre are irregular. Bentley invented the clerihew in school and then popularized it in books. One of his best known is this (1905):

Form
A clerihew has the following properties:
 It is biographical and usually whimsical, showing the subject from an unusual point of view; it mostly pokes fun at famous people
 It has four lines of irregular length and metre for comic effect
 The rhyme structure is AABB; the subject matter and wording are often humorously contrived in order to achieve a rhyme, including the use of phrases in Latin, French and other non-English languages
 The first line contains, and may consist solely of, the subject's name.  According to a letter in The Spectator in the 1960s, Bentley said that a true clerihew has to have the name "at the end of the first line", as the whole point was the skill in rhyming awkward names.

Clerihews are not satirical or abusive, but they target famous individuals and reposition them in an absurd, anachronistic or commonplace setting, often giving them an over-simplified and slightly garbled description.

Practitioners
The form was invented by and is named after Edmund Clerihew Bentley. When he was a 16-year-old pupil at St Paul's School in London, the lines of his first clerihew, about Humphry Davy, came into his head during a science class. Together with his schoolfriends, he filled a notebook with examples. The first known use of the word in print dates from 1928. Bentley published three volumes of his own clerihews: Biography for Beginners (1905), published as "edited by E. Clerihew"; More Biography (1929); and Baseless Biography (1939), a compilation of clerihews originally published in Punch illustrated by the author's son Nicolas Bentley.

G. K. Chesterton, a friend of Bentley, was also a practitioner of the clerihew and one of the sources of its popularity. Chesterton provided verses and illustrations for the original schoolboy notebook and illustrated Biography for Beginners. Other serious authors also produced clerihews, including W. H. Auden, and it remains a popular humorous form among other writers and the general public. Among contemporary writers, the satirist Craig Brown has made considerable use of the clerihew in his columns for The Daily Telegraph.

There has been newfound popularity of the form on Twitter.

Examples
Bentley's first clerihew, published in 1905, was written about Sir Humphry Davy:

The original poem had the second line "Was not fond of gravy"; but the published version has "Abominated gravy".

Other clerihews by Bentley include:

and

W. H. Auden's Academic Graffiti (1971) includes:

Satirical magazine Private Eye noted Auden's work and responded:

A second stanza aimed a jibe at Auden's publisher, Faber and Faber.

Alan Turing, one of the founders of computing, was the subject of a clerihew written by the pupils of his alma mater, Sherborne School in England:

A clerihew appreciated by chemists is cited in Dark Sun by Richard Rhodes, and regards the inventor of the thermos bottle (or Dewar flask): 

Dark Sun also features a clerihew about the German-British physicist and Soviet nuclear spy Klaus Fuchs:

In 1983, Games magazine ran a contest titled "Do You Clerihew?" The winning entry was:

Other uses of the form
The clerihew form has also occasionally been used for non-biographical verses. Bentley opened his 1905 Biography for Beginners with an example, entitled "Introductory Remarks", on the theme of biography itself:

The third edition of the same work, published in 1925, included a "Preface to the New Edition" in 11 stanzas, each in clerihew form. One stanza ran:

See also
Balliol rhyme
Double dactyl
Light verse

Notes

Further reading
Teague, Frances (1993). "Clerihew". Preminger, Alex; Brogan, T. V. F. (ed.), The New Princeton Encyclopedia of Poetry and Poetics. Princeton University Press. pp. 219–220.

External links

 
 Clerihews at the online journal of the Society of Classical Poets

Biography (genre)
Genres of poetry
Poetic forms